Ulises Ignacio Jaimes Huerta (born 20 April 1996) is a Mexican professional footballer who currently plays for Club Atlético La Paz.

Honours
Mexico U17
CONCACAF U-17 Championship: 2013
FIFA U-17 World Cup runner-up: 2013

References

External links
 

1996 births
Living people
Association football forwards
Atlético Morelia players
Monarcas Morelia Premier players
Coras de Nayarit F.C. footballers
Club Atlético Zacatepec players
Loros UdeC footballers
Alacranes de Durango footballers
C.D. Tepatitlán de Morelos players
Ascenso MX players
Tercera División de México players
Footballers from Michoacán
Mexican footballers
People from Lázaro Cárdenas, Michoacán